Marion L. Bloom (1891 – March 10, 1975) was a writer, nurse, and H. L. Mencken's lover for about a decade - eventually becoming close enough that they seriously considered marriage. They first met February 1914 when Bloom visited the office of Baltimore Sun. Mencken and Bloom ended their relationship in the early 1920s, though Bloom continued to admire Mencken. Their love letters were published in In Defense of Marion: The Love of Marion Bloom & H.L. Mencken in 1996.

Life
Bloom had been born and raised in rural New Windsor, Maryland, she had five brothers and a sister. When Bloom was seven her father committed suicide, forcing the older children in the family to find work. As a teen she moved to Washington to find work as a writer. Bloom met H. L. Mencken there in February 1914 and the two quickly began a relationship, with Mencken traveling to Washington to see her and she traveling to New York. Bloom spent six months as a United States army nurse in Europe during World War I, and returned to America newly converted to Christian Science. Mencken, an atheist, suggested that it was Bloom's faith that caused him not to marry her, although there were certainly other factors at play, and their relationship continued into the 1920s.

In 1923, in a shock to Mencken, Bloom began a short lived marriage to Lou Martizer, likely because she believed Mencken would never marry her, and in anger Mencken destroyed her letters to him. Afterwards, Bloom moved to France and by the time she returned to the United States, Mencken had married the terminally-ill Sara Haardt in 1930, who died four years later.

According to Fred Hobson, Bloom is "an interesting character in her own right... a compelling figure not so much because she is unique as because, in many respects, she is representative... She was the prototypical small-town girl, emerging from hardship, poverty, and religious piety, who went to the city to pursue her own idea of the American dream. But Marion was never fully able to determine what version of that dream she wanted most — whether to succeed as a new woman, self-reliant professionally and emotionally, or whether to play a more traditional role and become the wife of a powerful man such as H. L. Mencken. She could not easily, in her time, have both, and she ended up having neither." Edward A. Martin's book In Defense of Marion calls Bloom and Mencken's relationship "the most important love relationship in H. L. Mencken’s life, one that he tried to obscure and hoped would remain buried within the copious record of his achievements as author and editor" and notes that it "flourished during a period when he wrote frequently about women’s issues."

Although little is known about her later life, it seems Bloom authored a number of books, and wrote for American Mercury and The Washington Herald. She returned to the field of nursing again, working for the American Red Cross as assistant chief of the Resources Information unit, and may have served the army again as a nurse during World War II from 1944 until 1947. She worked for the Junior Red Cross, and in 1950 worked for the State Department, retiring ten years later. She died on March 10, 1975.

The correspondences between Mencken, Bloom, and her sister Estelle are housed at the Enoch Pratt Free Library of Baltimore and the New York Public Library.

References

1891 births
1975 deaths
American nurses
American women nurses
American women writers
Converts to Christian Science
American Christian Scientists
20th-century American women
H. L. Mencken